Congo competed at the 2020 Summer Paralympics in Tokyo, Japan, from 24 August to 5 September 2021. This was their second consecutive appearance at the Summer Paralympics since 2016.

Competitors
The following is the list of number of competitors participating in the Games:

Athletics 

Men's track

Women's field

See also 
 Congo at the Paralympics
 Republic of the Congo at the 2020 Summer Olympics

External links 
 Paralympics website 

Nations at the 2020 Summer Paralympics
2020
Summer Paralympics